Kim Yoon-Goo (born February 25, 1985) is a South Korean football player who since November 2008 has played for Suwon Samsung Bluewings.

References

1981 births
Living people
Association football defenders
South Korean footballers
Suwon Samsung Bluewings players
Gimcheon Sangmu FC players
K League 1 players